Kilbourn Public Library is a Carnegie library in Wisconsin Dells, Wisconsin United States. The library was built in 1912 and designed by Claude & Starck, an architectural firm from Madison known for its library plans. The library is designed in the Prairie School style with elements of Arts and Crafts movement architecture. The city of Wisconsin Dells eventually abandoned the library for a new building. In 1999, the old library building was moved next to the new building, where it is now used for offices. The library was added to the National Register of Historic Places on December 27, 1974.

References

External links
Kilbourn Public Library website

Libraries on the National Register of Historic Places in Wisconsin
Prairie School architecture in Wisconsin
Arts and Crafts architecture in the United States
Library buildings completed in 1913
Buildings and structures in Columbia County, Wisconsin
Carnegie libraries in Wisconsin
Wisconsin Dells, Wisconsin
1913 establishments in Wisconsin
National Register of Historic Places in Columbia County, Wisconsin